Judikael Ixoée (born 17 March 1990) is a New Caledonian  international footballer who plays as a right-back for the French side Carqueiranne and for the New Caledonia national team. He played in the 2012 OFC Nations Cup.

Awards

New Caledonia national football team 
 2012 OFC Nations Cup (runners-up).

References

1990 births
Living people
New Caledonian footballers
New Caledonia international footballers
AS Magenta players
2012 OFC Nations Cup players
2016 OFC Nations Cup players
Association football fullbacks